Ning Xiankui (born 19 May 1967) is a Chinese fencer. He competed in the team sabre event at the 1992 Summer Olympics.

References

1967 births
Living people
Chinese male sabre fencers
Olympic fencers of China
Fencers at the 1992 Summer Olympics
Asian Games medalists in fencing
Fencers at the 1994 Asian Games
Asian Games gold medalists for China
Medalists at the 1994 Asian Games
20th-century Chinese people